The Lady from Trévelez (Spanish:La señorita de Trevélez) is a play by the Spanish writer Carlos Arniches which was first performed in 1916.

Film adaptations
 In 1935 Edgar Neville directed The Lady from Trévelez
 In 1956 Juan Antonio Bardem directed Calle Mayor
 There have also been several television version

References

Bibliography
 Labanyi, Jo & Pavlović, Tatjana. A Companion to Spanish Cinema. John Wiley & Sons, 2012.

1916 plays
Spanish plays adapted into films
Plays set in Spain